Westmorland (formerly, Westmoreland) is a city in Imperial County, California. The population was 2,014 at the 2020 census, down from 2,225 at the 2010 census, up from 2,131 in 2000. It is part of the El Centro Metropolitan Area. The mayor of Westmorland is Ana Beltran.

Westmorland is on State Route 86, which was upgraded to a new six-lane highway to reduce its infamous auto accident and fatality risk, while it connects with Brawley, El Centro and Mexicali, Baja California, Mexico.

The post office, originally called Westmoreland, opened in 1909; it closed in 1912 and re-opened in 1919. It was renamed to Westmorland in 1936. Westmorland incorporated in 1934.

From the 1920s through the 1950s Westmorland was the site of illegal gaming establishments and many brothels, but these were later destroyed in an attempt to improve the town's image.

Westmorland has dealt with the image of high poverty rates, and prior to the 1990s North American Free Trade Agreement (NAFTA) economic boom, a nearly dormant farm food shipping industry.

Geography

Westmorland is below sea level and sits behind a number of active faults. Seismic activity has been recorded several times during the 20th century, with tremors occurring in 1907, 1916, 1925, 1940, 1948, 1965, and 1979. The 1987 Superstition Hills event caused serious damage in Westmorland and the Imperial Valley.

Demographics

2010
At the 2010 census Westmorland had a population of 2,225. The racial makeup of Westmorland was 1,038 (46.7%) White, 21 (0.9%) African American, 38 (1.7%) Native American, 11 (0.5%) Asian, 0 (0.0%) Pacific Islander, 1,042 (46.8%) from other races, and 75 (3.4%) from two or more races. Hispanic or Latino of any race were 1,938 persons (87.1%).

The whole population lived in households, no one lived in non-institutionalized group quarters and no one was institutionalized.

There were 631 households, 336 (53.2%) had children under the age of 18 living in them, 299 (47.4%) were opposite-sex married couples living together, 174 (27.6%) had a female householder with no husband present, 61 (9.7%) had a male householder with no wife present.  There were 61 (9.7%) unmarried opposite-sex partnerships, and 4 (0.6%) same-sex married couples or partnerships. 89 households (14.1%) were one person and 42 (6.7%) had someone living alone who was 65 or older. The average household size was 3.53.  There were 534 families (84.6% of households); the average family size was 3.82.

The age distribution was 765 people (34.4%) under the age of 18, 234 people (10.5%) aged 18 to 24, 527 people (23.7%) aged 25 to 44, 449 people (20.2%) aged 45 to 64, and 250 people (11.2%) who were 65 or older.  The median age was 29.2 years. For every 100 females, there were 87.8 males.  For every 100 females age 18 and over, there were 86.9 males.

There were 678 housing units at an average density of ,of which 631 were occupied, 299 (47.4%) by the owners and 332 (52.6%) by renters.  The homeowner vacancy rate was 1.6%; the rental vacancy rate was 5.9%.  1,066 people (47.9% of the population) lived in owner-occupied housing units and 1,159 people (52.1%) lived in rental housing units.

2000
At the 2000 census there were 2,131 people in 625 households, including 501 families, in the city. The racial makeup of the city was 55.8% White, 1.0% Black or African American, 0.7% Native American, 0.3% Asian, 0.1% Pacific Islander, 39.4% from other races, and 2.7% from two or more races.  82.2% of the population were Hispanic or Latino of any race.
Of the 625 households 47.7% had children under the age of 18 living with them, 56.0% were married couples living together, 19.0% had a female householder with no husband present, and 19.7% were non-families. 17.0% of households were one person and 8.5% were one person aged 65 or older.  The average household size was 3.4 and the average family size was 3.9.

The age distribution was 35.8% under the age of 18, 10.5% from 18 to 24, 26.5% from 25 to 44, 17.7% from 45 to 64, and 9.6% 65 or older.  The median age was 29 years. For every 100 females, there were 94.4 males.  For every 100 females age 18 and over, there were 92.3 males.

The median income for a household in the city was $23,365, and the median family income  was $26,667. Males had a median income of $27,500 versus $19,107 for females. The per capita income for the city was $8,941.  About 27.3% of families and 27.2% of the population were below the poverty line, including 37.9% of those under age 18 and 14.6% of those age 65 or over.

Politics

Schools
Westmorland children (grades K-8) are part of the Westmorland Elementary School District, while high-school age students are members of the neighboring Brawley Union High School District.

Infrastructure

Public safety
Westmorland has one of the smallest police departments in California, with a chief and five full-time officers with only five patrol cars. The Imperial County Fire Department provides fire and paramedic services.

Utilities
The city's public works department operates its own water and wastewater system.

See also
 
 1981 Westmorland earthquake
 San Diego–Imperial, California
 El Centro Metropolitan Area

References

External links

Cities in Imperial County, California

Communities in the Lower Colorado River Valley
Populated places in the Colorado Desert
Incorporated cities and towns in California